Han Deok-su (1907–2001) founded the General Association of Korean Residents in Japan (Chongryon) in 1955. When Han died in 2001, a funeral committee was appointed with So Man-sul as its chairman and Ho Jong-man as vice chairman.

References 

Zainichi Korean people
People from North Gyeongsang Province
1907 births
2001 deaths